Richard Dorian Matvichuk (born February 5, 1973) is a Canadian former National Hockey League defenceman. He played 14 seasons with the Minnesota North Stars/Dallas Stars, and the New Jersey Devils of the National Hockey League.

Playing career
Although he was born in Edmonton, Alberta, Matvichuk was raised in the nearby city of Fort Saskatchewan. Matvichuk was drafted eighth overall in the 1991 NHL Entry Draft by the Minnesota North Stars, and made the transition, along with several other players, including Mike Modano and Derian Hatcher, to the franchise's move to Dallas, and played 733 regular season games as a Dallas Star.  Matvichuk played 12 years for the Stars, scoring 38 goals and 129 assists, although with a rather low average of penalty minutes compared with his physical style of play.

Matvichuk was also a part of the 1999 Stanley Cup winning team which brought Dallas their first championship trophy.  He became a free agent in the 2004 NHL offseason.  He was later signed by the New Jersey Devils, making a similar Stars-to-Devils transition as Jamie Langenbrunner and Joe Nieuwendyk.  He missed all but the last game of the 2006–07 season after having back surgery.  He was released by the Columbus Blue Jackets during the 2008 preseason, when he was there on a tryout basis.

Coaching
On May 4, 2012, Matvichuk was announced as the assistant general manager and defensive coach of Central Hockey League's Allen Americans.  On June 12, 2014, he was named the head coach of the ECHL's Missouri Mavericks. On June 2, 2016, Matvichuk was named head coach of the Western Hockey League's Prince George Cougars. He was fired as head coach of the Cougars on February 8, 2019, after an overall 85–89–22 record with the team that was on an eleven-game losing streak during the 2018–19 season.

Career statistics

Regular season and playoffs

International

Awards
 WHL East First All-Star Team – 1992
Stanley Cup champion – 1999

References

External links

1973 births
Canadian ice hockey defencemen
Dallas Stars players
Fort Saskatchewan Traders players
Kalamazoo Wings (1974–2000) players
Living people
Lowell Devils players
Minnesota North Stars draft picks
Minnesota North Stars players
Missouri Mavericks coaches
National Hockey League first-round draft picks
New Jersey Devils players
People from Fort Saskatchewan
Prince George Cougars coaches
Saskatoon Blades players
Ice hockey people from Edmonton
Stanley Cup champions
Canadian ice hockey coaches